Yassir Znagui (born 1970 in Tangier, Morocco) is a Moroccan businessman and politician. He was Minister of Tourism between 2010 and 2011 in the government of Abbas El Fassi. He is currently an adviser to King Mohammed VI.

References

Moroccan politicians
People from Tangier
Living people
Moroccan businesspeople
1970 births
Advisors of Mohammed VI of Morocco
Alumni of Lycée Descartes (Rabat)
National Rally of Independents politicians
People named in the Pandora Papers